Stone Bridge may refer to:

Bridges
 Stone Bridge (Adana), across the Seyhan River in Adana, Turkey
 Stone Bridge (Saint Petersburg), across Griboedov Canal in Saint Petersburg, Russia
 Stone Bridge (Skopje), across the Vardar River in Skopje, Macedonia
 Stone Bridge (Manassas), an American Civil War landmark in Manassas National Battlefield Park
 Stone Bridge (Regensburg), across the Danube in Regensburg, Germany
 Stone Bridge (Rhode Island), across the Sakonnet River in Rhode Island
 Stone Bridge (Riga), across the Daugava in Riga, Latvia
 Stone Bridge (Johnstown, Pennsylvania), historic railroad bridge across the Conemaugh River in Johnstown, Pennsylvania
 Stone Bridge (Estonia) , former bridge in Tartu, Estonia

Other uses
 Stone Bridge Press, an American publishing company
 Stone Bridge, Virginia, an unincorporated community in the United States
 Stone Bridge High School, Ashburn, Virginia, United States

See also
 Zidani Most (Stone Bridge), a town and an important railway junction in Slovenia
 Pont de Pierre (disambiguation)
 Ponte Pietra (Verona) (Italian for Stone Bridge), a Roman bridge across the Adige in Verona, Italy
 Puente de Piedra (Zaragoza) (Stone Bridge), a historic bridge across the Ebro River in Zaragoza, Spain
 Bolshoy Kamenny Bridge, across the Moskva River in Moscow, Russia (Greater Stone Bridge in Russian, although the bridge is steel)
 Kamenný Most (disambiguation) (Stone Bridge in Czech)
 Pol Sangi, across the Quri River in Tabriz, Iran (Stone Bridge in Farsi)
 Stonebridge (disambiguation)
 Stoneybridge